Paula Hancocks is an international correspondent for CNN television news network. She is based in Seoul, South Korea, and is the channel's representative in the Korean Peninsula.

Career
Hancocks joined CNN in 1997, and had broadcast from its London branch. Among others, she covered the Israeli–Palestinian conflict, and Israel's conflict with Hezbollah in 2006. From 2001, she served as a production assistant, and rose through the ranks.

References

British expatriates in Israel
British expatriates in South Korea
British women journalists
CNN people
Living people
Year of birth missing (living people)